The Shaheed Minar ( romanised:- Shohid Minar lit. " The Martyr Tower") is a national monument in Dhaka, Bangladesh, established to commemorate those killed during the Bengali Language Movement demonstrations of 1952 in then East Pakistan.

On 21 and 22 February 1952, students from Dhaka University and Dhaka Medical College and political activists were killed when the Pakistani police force opened fire on Bengali protesters who were demanding official status for their native tongue, Bengali. The massacre occurred near Dhaka Medical College and Ramna Park in Dhaka. A makeshift monument was erected on 23 February by students of Dhaka medical college and other educational institutions, but soon demolished on 26
February by the Pakistani police force.

The Language Movement gained momentum, and after a long struggle, Bengali gained official status in Pakistan (with Urdu) in 1956. To commemorate the dead, the Shaheed Minar was designed and built by Bangladeshi sculptors Hamidur Rahman in collaboration with Novera Ahmed. Construction was delayed by martial law, but the monument was finally completed in 1963, and stood until the Bangladesh Liberation War in 1971, when it was demolished completely during Operation Searchlight. After Bangladesh gained independence later that year, it was rebuilt. It was expanded in 1983.

National, mourning, cultural and other activities are held each year on 21 February (Ekushey February) to mark Language Movement Day or Shaheed Dibas (Martyrs' Day), centred on the Shaheed Minar. Since 2000, 21 February is also recognised as International Mother Language Day.

History

The First Shaheed Minar

The first Shaheed Minar was built immediately after the events of 21–22 February 1952. According to Dr. Sayeed Haider the main planner and the designer of the first Shaheed Minar, the decision to build it was first made by the students of Dhaka Medical College. Shaheed Minar is situated near Dhaka Medical College Hospital and in the Dhaka University area. It is adjacent to the Mathematics department of Dhaka University. It is only 0.5 kilometres (0.3 mi) away from Shahbag and 0.25 km (0.16 mi) distant from Chankharpul. Shaheed Minar is an outstanding monument of Bangladesh. It was built to tribute the martyrs who given up their life for language. The main incident had been occurring inside of Dhaka medical college hospital. So a decision was taken to build a memorial adjacent to DMCH. The planning started at midnight on 22 February, and the work started the next day. This Minar was sponsored by Pearu Sardar, one of the old Dhaka panchayet sardars, when some of the students asked his help at midnight of 22 February, to contribute the raw materials needed to build the monument. Although curfew was in place, students started building the Minar in the afternoon of 23 February. They worked through the night and finished it at dawn. A hand written paper was attached to the Minar with "Shaheed Smritistombho" written on it. The Minar was inaugurated by the father of Shafiur Rahman, Molvi. Mahabubur Rahman, who killed during the massacre. It was demolished on 26 February by the police and Pakistani Army. Smaller versions of the memorial were built in other places. The first Shaheed Minar monument was then destroyed four days after its erection, on February 26, 1952, by the Pakistani Police and Army. A signboard placed by the police force on top of the rubble from the Minar read "mosque".

Two years after the first monument was destroyed by the then police force, a new Shaheed Minar (Monument of Martyrs) was constructed in 1954 at the same place, to commemorate the protesters who lost their lives. This minar was inaugurated by the then Professor of Dhaka University and the pioneer and most prominent cultural and literary personality Natyaguru Nurul Momen. Work on a larger monument designed by the architect Hamidur Rahman began in 1957 with the support of the United Front government.

Shaheed Minar (1963–1971)

Following the formation of local government by the United Front in April 1954, the anniversary of 21 February was declared a holiday and it became possible to construct the new monument. A foundation stone was laid in 1956, and a government committee chaired by University of Dhaka Vice-Chancellor Dr Mahmud Husain and including the principal of the Fine College of Arts, Zainul Abedin, was constituted to plan, design, and approve the monument's construction. The committee approved the design of sculptor Hamidur Rahman, followed by the construction of Shaheed Minar, starting in 1957. Hamidur Rahman's model was a huge complex on a large area of land in the yard of Dhaka Medical College Hostel. The enormous design included a half-circular column to symbolise the mother with her fallen sons standing on the monument's central dais.  Yellow and deep blue pieces of stained glass, symbolising eyes reflecting the sun, were also to be placed in the columns. The marble floor was designed to reflect the moving shadows of the columns. The basement of the Minar also included a  fresco depicting the history of the language movement. A railing decorated with Bengali alphabet was to be constructed in front. Two footmarks coloured red and black, indicating the two opposite forces, were also in the design. Besides this a museum and a library were also included in Hamidur Rahman's design. A fountain shaped like an eye was also to be constructed. Rahman specifically designed the materials of the monument to withstand the area's tropical climate.

Construction started in November 1957, under the supervision of Hamidur Rahman and Novera Ahmed. Most of the work, including the basement, platform, some of the columns with the rails, footprints and some of the murals were also finished when martial law was declared in the area, and the construction was forced to a halt. Construction work was completed in 1963, leaving much of Fatamatuj's design unfinished. It was inaugurated on 21 February 1963, by the mother of Abul Barkat, Hasina Begum. The Minar was severely damaged by the Pakistan Army during the Bangladesh Liberation War in 1971. The columns were destroyed on the night of the commencement of the genocide, 25 March 1971.
The Pakistani Army crushed the Minar and placed over the rubble a signboard reading "Mosque".

Re-establishment of Shaheed Minar and current state
In 1972, a committee headed by the then president Abu Sayeed Chowdhury was formed and renovation work began. The original sketch was ignored, while the Construction and Building Directorate followed the 1963 design. The construction went quickly, according to a modified design from 1963. The murals destroyed by the Pakistani army were not restored and the basement was sealed off. Hamidur Rahman's original design was not approved by the directorate in the renovation work. In the mid-eighties, the monument underwent further renovation under the supervision of the then Department of Architecture chief architect SHM Abul Bashar, which extended the area of the Shaheed Minar premises, giving it a square shape from a triangular one. Quarters concerned demanded proper implementation of the design by Hamidur Rahman with the help of sculptor Novera Ahmed and Danish architect Gean Deleuran. ASM Ismail said that because of the extension, two entrances to the basement murals were permanently closed, and after remaining in an abandoned state for 15 years, the murals had lost much of their gloss. In the 1983 renovation, the original poor materials were lined with marble stone. A museum and library were also featured in the original plan. In August 2010, the High Court issued eight directives for the maintenance and renovation of the Shaheed Minar and asked the Public Works Department to establish a museum and a library on its premises.

Despite some flaws of proportionality, the Shaheed Minar still stands high. It is one of the city's most important monuments. The Shaheed Minar of Dhaka has a very close association with the city's cultural history. It also happens to be one of the primary Dhaka tourist attractions and is visited by thousands of tourists throughout the year. It is one of the most well-maintained monuments in Bangladesh. Special care is taken each year on the occasion of 21 February (Ekushey February). The premises are washed and cleaned thoroughly. Artists of the Faculty of Fine Arts of Dhaka University then colourfully paint the Central Shaheed Minar premises with intricate designs. Thus the Shaheed Minar premises are colourful throughout the year.

Architecture
The enormous design includes a half-circular arrangement of columns to symbolise the mother, with her fallen sons, standing on the monument's central dais, and the red sun shining behind. The stairs and barrier are highlighted in white, to create a divine look. The fence on both sides is painted with lines from poems of legendary poets in iron letters. As the visitors enter the monument they will find two statues of the patriots who sacrificed their lives in that heinous police firing of 1952. The marble floor was designed to reveal the moving shadows of the columns. The basement of the Shaheed Minar also included a 1,500-square-foot (140 m2) mural representing the history of the Language Movement.

Hurried repair of the Shaheed Minar resulted in the Minar to be reconstructed incorrectly. The height of the column was shorter and the head bent more than originally planned, and the proportions of different parts of the monument were not properly maintained.

Significance

The Language Movement was one of the formidable movements which has come up in the country of Bangladesh, thus the Central Shaheed Minar epitomises efforts to represent the spirit of Bangladeshi nationalism and also highlight the importance of the Bengali language in the social and cultural progress of the country.  As a result, the Shaheed Minar has a very significant place in the social and cultural mechanism of Bangladesh.

At present, all national, mourning, cultural and other activities held each year, regarding 21 February, have been centred on the Shaheed Minar.

Location

The Shaheed Minar is situated near Dhaka Medical College Hospital and in the Dhaka University area. It is adjacent to the Mathematics Department of Dhaka University.

Celebration 
The Shaheed Minar is symbol of Freedom for every countries Mother Tongue. This structure represents all the fallen citizens that gave their lives. So we can have the ability to speak our Mother Language around the world without being discriminated. The City Of Boynton Beach and the Honorable Mayor Steven B. Grant and his fellow commissioners have recognized this meaning, and with the help of ABPAC (American Bangladesh Public Affairs Council )  The City of Boynton Beach will celebrate and recognize that February 21 will be known as International Mother Language Day.

References

Further reading

 
 

Monuments and memorials in Dhaka
National symbols of Bangladesh
Martyrs' monuments and memorials
Bengali language movement